Eucalyptus propinqua, commonly known as the grey gum or small-fruited grey gum, is a species of medium-sized to tall tree that is endemic to eastern Australia. It has smooth, mottled bark, lance-shaped to curved adult leaves that are paler on the lower surface, flower buds in groups of between seven and fifteen, white flowers and conical or hemispherical fruit.

Description
It has smooth mottled grey, cream-coloured and yellowish bark that is shed in strips. Flowering occurs from January to April and the flowers are white.

Taxonomy and naming
Eucalyptus propinqua was first formally described in 1896 by Joseph Maiden and Henry Deane in Proecceding of the Linnean Society of New South Wales. The specific epithet (propinqua) is from the Latin propinquus meaning "near", referring to the similarity of the bark to that of E. punctata.

Distribution and habitat
Grey gum grows in open forest on low hills and ridges in coastal and near-coastal areas between Gympie in Queensland and the Hawkesbury River in New South Wales.

Uses

Timber
The timber is very hard and heavy and is used for poles, piles, sleepers, heavy engineering construction, marine construction, flooring, and decking.

Gallery

References 

propinqua
Myrtales of Australia
Flora of New South Wales
Flora of Queensland
Plants described in 1896